Llywelyn Bren, or Llywelyn ap Gruffudd ap Rhys / Llywelyn ap Rhys (also Llewelyn) or in . He was a nobleman who led a 1316 revolt in Wales in the reign of King Edward II of England. It marked the last serious challenge to English rule in Wales until the attempts of Owain Lawgoch to invade with French support in the 1370s. Hugh Despenser the Younger's unlawful execution of Llywelyn Bren helped to lead to the eventual overthrow of both Edward II and Hugh.

Lineage
Llywelyn Bren was a Welsh nobleman of the minor royal house of the cantref of Senghenydd, (previously Cantref Breiniol) and Miscin, and was also a descendant of Ifor Bach, his great-grandfather. His father was Gruffudd ap Rhys. Llywelyn is thought to have been born before 1267, as Gruffudd was dispossessed of the lordship of Senghenydd in that year by Gilbert de Clare, 7th Earl of Gloucester and then imprisoned in Ireland. There is no record of him returning to Wales. Llywelyn married Lleucu (died 1349). They produced at least seven sons, who also took part in the revolt.

Background of the revolt
Before the outbreak of Llywelyn's revolt in 1316, there had already been violence in the Welsh Marcher lands of south-east Wales. The Battle of Bannockburn in June 1314 marked the death of Gilbert de Clare, 8th Earl of Gloucester the Lord of Glamorgan. He had been the most prominent landowner in the south and his death left a regional power vacuum. There was a heavy-handed response from the English Crown to overseeing De Clare's lands. That combined with the death of several hundred men of Glamorgan at Bannockburn caused a revolt in the lordship in late summer that year. Llywelyn seems not to have taken part. The revolt appears to have ended when King Edward II of England appointed Bartholomew de Badlesmere, as royal custodian in Glamorgan.

Revolt and siege of Caerphilly Castle
In 1315, Edward II, as guardian of the three sisters and heiresses of the estate of Gilbert de Clare, 8th Earl of Gloucester, replaced de Badlesmere with a new English administrator, Payn de Turberville of Coity Castle was appointed as replacement to Earl de Clare. Bren had previously had office under the Earl who he considered a friend. Payn persecuted the Glamorgan people, who were then, like many in northern Europe at the time, in the throes of a serious famine.

Llywelyn denounced the new administration of de Turberville, however he was accused of sedition. Llywelyn the appealed to King Edward II to call off or control his self-interested agent. But Edward ordered Llywelyn to appear before Parliament to face the treason charge. The king stated that if the charges were found true, Llywelyn would be hanged. Bren was called 'Son of death' by the King of England, and summoned to Lincoln for 27 January 1316, but secretly fled home, and had no problems starting a revolt with the general discontent throughout Wales.

After returning to Wales, Llywelyn's revolt begun on 28 January 1316 with a surprise attack on Caerphilly Castle. With 10,000 Welshmen and his six sons Bren went against Turberville and the English administration, he captured the Constable outside the castle and he and his men captured the outer ward but could not break into the inner defences of the castle. They burned the town, killed some of its townsfolk and started a siege. The revolt quickly spread through Glamorgan and Gwent. Kenfig Castle was sacked, as was that of Llantrisant, and several others were attacked, including St Georges-super-Ely, Tregrug Castle at Llangibby and Dinefwr Castle. Towns including Cardiff were raided and buildings burned. Edward ordered the revolt to be crushed by Humphrey de Bohun, 4th Earl of Hereford and Lord of neighbouring Brecon, who gathered overwhelming forces supported by men of the chief Marcher Lords like Henry of Grosmont, 1st Duke of Lancaster and Roger Mortimer, 1st Earl of March of Chirk Castle. Troops came from Cheshire and north Wales, and some Welsh soldiers from west Wales. In March, forces advanced from Cardiff and in a brief battle at Castell Morgraig forced Llywelyn and his men to break off the Caerphilly siege after six weeks. The Welsh retreated higher up the north Glamorgan plateau, while Hereford and his men were moving south from Brecon.

Betrayal and death
Realising the fight was hopeless, on 18 March 1316 Llywelyn surrendered to the Earl of Hereford at Ystradfellte, Llywelyn had gathered his forces in the hills and told them the revolt was his fault and he would surrender, he pleaded that only he should be punished and his followers spared. This gallant behaviour earned him the respect of his captors, including Roger Mortimer, one of the witnesses to his surrender. Hereford and Mortimer both promised to try to intercede on Llywelyn's behalf. Bren was sent as a prisoner first to London in July 1316, and the Tower of London from 27 July 1316 to 17 June 1317. Hereford and Mortimer urged the King to pardon Llywelyn and his family and it seems likely that their influence won a pardon for many of Llywelyn's men.

In 1317 Llywelyn became the prisoner of the ruthless Hugh, the younger Despenser, one of King Edward's favourites at court, who had become Lord of Glamorgan in November 1317 and so the largest landowner in South Wales and a great rival of Mortimer. Without the king's direction, he took Llywelyn Bren to Cardiff Castle, where he had him hanged, drawn and quartered with conspicuous judicial process. After parts of his body had been exhibited in various parts of the county he was buried in the Grey Friars at Cardiff. Llywelyn's lands were seized by Despenser. The action was condemned at the time and later used as example of the growing tyranny of Despenser, who also imprisoned Lleucu and some of her sons in Cardiff.

The aftermath
As antipathy to the Despensers grew, Llywelyn's death united the native Welsh and Marcher Lords. In 1321 a baronial revolt arose. Barons under the Earl of Hereford and others like Hugh D'Audley and Roger D'Amory petitioned the king to dismiss Despenser; the murder of Llywelyn Bren was prominent on their list of complaints. When the king refused, an alliance of local Welsh men and Marcher Lords raided Despenser's lands in Glamorgan for some ten days. This may have been when Lleucu and her sons were freed – certainly Hereford took all Llywelyn's sons into his service about that time. Edward had to exile the Despensers until he gathered forces to defeat the barons at the Battle of Boroughbridge in 1322, where the Earl of Hereford died.

With the Despensers' return to Edward's court, Lleucu and her sons were again imprisoned, this time in Bristol Castle, but their actions soon aroused more resistance. In October 1326 a successful rebellion led by Roger Mortimer gave the Despensers and Edward further cause to regret their actions in Glamorgan after being forced to flee there. Their attempts to raise troops locally were an unsurprising failure. It led to their capture in November. Hugh, like Llywelyn, was then hanged, drawn and quartered; Edward was deposed, imprisoned, and probably murdered.

With the overthrow of Edward II, the estates in Senghenydd were restored on 11 February 1327 to Llywelyn Bren's sons – Gruffydd, John, Meurig, Roger, William and Llywelyn. The Earls of Hereford (sixth creation) continued to pay at Brecon an allowance to their mother Lleucu until 12 April 1349.

References

Bibliography

Year of birth missing
13th-century births
1318 deaths
People executed under the Plantagenets by hanging, drawing and quartering
Welsh rebels
Executed Welsh people
History of Glamorgan
People from Glamorgan